Khlong Ngae railway station is a railway station located in Phang La Subdistrict, Sadao District, Songkhla.

Services 
 Special Express No. 45/46 Bangkok–Padang Besar–Bangkok
 Special Cross-Border Service No. 947/948 Hat Yai Junction–Padang Besar–Hat Yai Junction
 Special Cross-Border Service No. 949/950 Hat Yai Junction–Padang Besar–Hat Yai Junction

Former services
 Express Peninsular (KTM) No. 953/954 Hat Yai Junction–JB Sentral–Hat Yai Junction

References 
 
 

Railway stations in Thailand
Buildings and structures in Songkhla province